Republican Progressive Party  (PPR) was a political party in the Central African Republic. The PPR was led by Henri Maïdou, a former Prime Minister in Jean-Bédel Bokassa's cabinet. Maïdou was the PPR candidate in the 1981 presidential elections and finished fourth of five candidates with 3% of the vote.

References

Defunct political parties in the Central African Republic
Political parties with year of disestablishment missing
Political parties with year of establishment missing